Indophenol is an organic compound with the formula OC6H4NC6H4OH.  It is deep blue dye that is the product of the Berthelot's reaction, a common test for ammonia.  The indophenol group, with various substituents in place of OH and various ring substitutions, is found in many dyes used in hair coloring and textiles.

Indophenol is used in hair dyes, lubricants, redox materials, liquid crystal displays, fuel cells and chemical-mechanical polishing. It is an environmental pollutant and is toxic to fish.

Berthelot test
In the Berthelot test (1859), a sample suspected of having containing ammonia is treated with sodium hypochlorite and phenol. The formation of indophenol is used to determine ammonia and paracetamol by spectrophotometry. Other phenols can be used. Dichlorophenol-indophenol (DCPIP), a form of indophenol, is often used to determine the presence of vitamin C (ascorbic acid).

Related compounds
Indophenol blue is a different compound with systematic name N-(p-dimethylaminophenyl)-1,4-naphthoquinoneimine.

References

Indophenol dyes